Treglwang is a former municipality in the district of Liezen in the Austrian state of Styria. Since the 2015 Styria municipal structural reform, it is part of the municipality Gaishorn am See.

Geography
Treglwang lies in the Palten valley.

References

Cities and towns in Liezen District